The UK Theatre Awards, established in 1991 and known before 2011 as the TMA Awards, are presented annually by UK Theatre (formerly the Theatrical Management Association) in recognition of creative excellence and outstanding work in regional theatre throughout England, Scotland, Wales and Northern Ireland.

Past winning productions

Past winning performers

Past winning creatives

Past winning achievements in dance and opera 
{| class="wikitable"
! scope="col" width="70" | Year
! scope="col" width="400" | Achievement in Dance
! scope="col" width="400" | Achievement in Opera
|-
|2016
|Gary Clarke for Coal
|The Royal Opera and Guildhall School Of Music and Drama for 4.48 Psychosis in association with the Lyric Hammersmith
|-
|2015
|
|
|-
|2014
|
|
|-
|2013
|Independent dance artist Wendy Houstoun for her insightful, funny solo 50 Acts
|Welsh National Opera for the productions of Lulu & Lohengrin, conducted by Lothar Koenigs
|-
|2012
|
|
|-
|2011
|
|
|-
|2010
|The Mark Morris Dance Group for L'allegro, Il Pensero Ed Il Moderato
|Welsh National Opera's production of Die Meistersinger von Nürnberg
|-
|2009
|The dancers of English National Ballet, who showed new strength and interpretative skills across a range of repertory
|Glyndebourne for an outstanding 75th Anniversary season
|-
| 2008 || Theatre-Rites & Arthur Pita for Mischief ||Opera North for its summer Shakespeare season
|-
| 2007 || ''Birmingham Royal Ballets Stravinsky! A Celebration 2007||Opera North's Peter Grimes
|-
| 2006 
||Les Ballets Trockadero De Monte Carlo for their hilarious blend of low comedy and high glamour that lampoons and celebrates the golden age of classical ballet || Welsh National Opera's Mazeppa
|-
| 2005 || Mark Baldwin for the creation of Constant Speed and the high calibre of his artistic directorship of Rambert Dance Company||The Partnership of Vladimir Jurowski and Richard Jones for Welsh National Operas Wozzeck
|-
| 2004 || Scottish Ballet for sure-footed modernisation under Ashley Page and dynamic performances || Opera North for its Eight Little Greats season at Leeds and on tour
|-
| 2003 ||George Piper Dances' Critics' Choice ****** programme|| Tristan und Isolde at Glyndebourne
|-
| 2002 ||Christopher Hampson for Double Concerto, an outstanding new ballet in a fine year for repertory at English National Ballet || Scottish Opera for Die Walküre and Siegfried
|-
| 2001 || Rambert Dance Company for their performance of Mats Ek's She Was Black|| Richard Jones, Vladimir Jurowski and the company for Welsh National Opera's production of The Queen of Spades
|-
| 2000 || Tamara Rojo for her outstanding performances for English National Ballet|| Anja Silja, Amanda Roocroft and Jir Belohlvek for leading Glyndebourne's revival of Jenufa
|-
| 1999 || Lez Brotherston for Northern Ballet Theatre's Carmen, The Hunchback Of Notre Dame, Giselle, Dracula and A Christmas Carol|| Scottish Opera, especially for its outstanding productions of Der Rosenkavalier and Macbeth
|-
| 1998 || David Bintley for the choreography of Edward II, for mounting the Balanchine bill and for reviving Dame Ninette de Valois' The Prospect Before Us for Birmingham Royal Ballet|| Welsh National Opera for Billy Budd and The Coronation of Poppea
|-
| 1997 || The dancers of Rambert Dance Company for their performances in Airs, Eidolon, Port For Angels and Stream || The cast and production of Scottish Opera's Idomeneo
|}

Other 2013 winners
The 2013 UK Theatre Award winners were announced on 20 October 2013.The Renee Stepham Award for Best Presentation of Touring Theatre: Scottish OperaAchievement in Marketing; Northern BalletTheatre Employee/Manager of the Year: Brenda Walliss – Princess Theatre, TorquayPromotion of Diversity: Contact Theatre ManchesterMy Theatre Matters! UK's Most Welcoming Theatre in association with Classic FM''': The Bike Shed Theatre

References

Awards established in 1991
1991 establishments in the United Kingdom
British theatre awards